The discography of Brazilian singer Maria Bethânia consists of 34 studio albums, 15 live albums, several participations in movie and telenovela soundtracks as well as numerous collaborations with other artists.

Albums

Studio albums 
 1965 - Maria Bethânia - Sony Music/RCA
 1967 - Edu e Bethânia - Universal Music/Elenco
 1969 - Maria Bethânia - EMI
 1971 - A Tua Presença... - Universal Music/Philips/Polygram
 1971 - Vinicius + Bethânia + Toquinho - en La Fusa (Mar de Plata) - RGE
 1972 - Drama - Universal Music/Philips/Polygram
 1976 - Pássaro proibido - Universal Music/Philips/Polygram
 1977 - Pássaro da manhã - Universal Music/Philips/Polygram
 1978 - Álibi - Universal Music/Philips/Polygram
 1979 - Mel - Universal Music/Philips/Polygram
 1980 - Talismã - Universal Music/Philips/Polygram
 1981 - Alteza - Universal Music/Philips/Polygram
 1983 - Ciclo - Universal Music/Philips/Polygram
 1984 - A beira e o mar - Universal Music/Philips/Polygram
 1987 - Dezembros - Sony Music/RCA
 1988 - Maria - Sony Music/RCA
 1989 - Memória da pele - Universal Music/Polygram
 1990 - 25 anos - Universal Music/Polygram
 1992 - Olho d'água - Universal Music/Polygram
 1993 - As canções que você fez pra mim - Universal Music/Polygram
 1993 - Las canciones que hiciste para mí -  Philips-PolyGram
 1996 - Âmbar - EMI
 1999 - A força que nunca seca - Sony Music
 2001 - Maricotinha - Sony Music
 2003 - Cânticos, preces, súplicas à Senhora dos jardins do céu na voz de Maria Bethânia - Sony Music/Biscoito Fino
 2003 - Brasileirinho - Quitanda
 2005 - Que falta você me faz - Músicas de Vinicius de Moraes - Biscoito Fino
 2006 - Pirata - Quitanda
 2006 - Mar de Sophia - Biscoito Fino
 2007 - Omara Portuondo e Maria Bethânia - Biscoito Fino
 2009 - Encanteria - Quitanda
 2009 - Tua - Biscoito Fino
 2012 - Oásis de Bethânia

Live albums 
 1968 - Recital na Boite Barroco - EMI
 1970 - Maria Bethânia Ao vivo - EMI
 1971 - Rosa dos ventos Ao vivo - Universal Music/Philips/Polygram
 1973 - Drama 3º ato - Universal Music/Philips/Polygram
 1974 - Cena muda - Universal Music/Philips/Polygram
 1975 - Chico Buarque & Maria Bethânia ao vivo - Universal Music/Philips/Polygram
 1976 - Doces Bárbaros - Universal Music/Philips/Polygram
 1978 - Maria Bethânia e Caetano Veloso - ao vivo - Universal Music/Philips/Polygram
 1982 - Nossos Momentos - Universal Music/Philips/Polygram
 1995 - Maria Bethânia: Ao vivo - Universal Music/Polygram
 1997 - Imitação da Vida - EMI
 1998 - Diamante Verdadeiro - Sony Music
 2002 - Maricotinha: Ao Vivo - Biscoito Fino
 2007 - Dentro Do Mar Tem Rio - Biscoito Fino
 2010 - Amor, Festa, Devoção - Biscoito Fino
 2012 - Noite Luzidia - Biscoito Fino
 2013 - Carta de Amor - Biscoito Fino
 2015 - Brasileirinho - Quitanda

Box sets 
 2011 - Box Maria - Universal Music
 2011 - Box Bethânia - Universal Music

Soundtracks and collaborations 
 Quando o Carnaval Chegar Movie Soundtrack, on tracks Baioque and Bom Conselho by Chico Buarque,  and on tracks Minha Embaixada Chegou, by Assis Valente and Formosa, by Nássara and J. Rui, featuring Nara Leão – Phonogram, 1972
 Nova Bossa Nova Festival Folklore e Bossa Nova do Brasil 72, on tracks Bodocó by Gordurinha and Não Tem Solução by Dorival Caymmi with Terra Trio – MPS Records, Germany, 1972
 Phono 73, on track Oração a Mãe Menininha by Dorival Caymmi featuring Gal Costa; Preciso Aprender a Só Ser, by Gilberto Gil featuring Gilberto Gil himself and on Trampolim by Caetano and Bethânia, with Caetano Veloso – Polygram, volume 3, 1973
 Gabriela Soundtrack, on track Coração Ateu by Sueli Costa – Som Livre, 1975
 Erasmo Carlos Convida, on track Cavalgada by Erasmo Carlos and Roberto Carlos – Polygram, 1980
 Sorriso Negro, by Dona Yvonne Lara, on track A Sereia Guiomar by Yvonne Lara and Delcio Carvalho – WEA, 1981
 Roberto Carlos, on track Amiga by Roberto Carlos and Erasmo Carlos – CBS, 1982
 Plunct, Plact, Zuuum, on track Brincar de Viver by Guilherme Arantes and Jon Lucien – Som Livre, Various, 1983
 Luz e Esplendor, by Elizeth Cardoso, on track Elizetheana with Alcione, Cauby Peixoto, Dona Ivone Lara, Joyce, Nana Caymmi and Paulinho da Viola – ARCA SOM, 1984
 Da cor do Brasil, by Alcione, on track Roda Ciranda by Martinho da Vila – RCA, 1984
 Nordeste Já, on tracks Chega de Mágoa, and Seca d’Água, based on a poem by Patativa do Assaré – Continental, various, 1985
 Sinceramente Teu, by Joan Manuel Serrat, on track Sinceramente Teu by Santiago Kovadoff – Ariola, 1986
 Negro Demais no Coração, by Joyce, on track Tarde em Itapoã, by Vinícius de Moraes and Toquinho – CBS, 1988
 Uns, by Caetano Veloso, on track Salva Vida by Caetano Veloso – Polygram, 1989
 Nelson Gonçalves e Convidados, on track Caminhemos by Herivelto Martins – RCA, 1989
 A trilha Sonora África Brasil, on track Mamãe Oxum by André Luiz Oliveira and Costa Netto – EMI, 1989
 Brasil, by João Gilberto, Caetano Veloso and Gilberto Gil, on track No Tabuleiro da Baiana by Ary Barroso – WEA, 1991
 Songbook Noel Rosa, on track Pela Décima Vez by Noel Rosa – Lumiar Discos, 1991
 No Tom da Mangueira, on tracks Primavera and Cântico à Natureza by Nelson Sargento, Alfredo Português and Jamelão, with the vocal group Garganta Profunda – Saci, various, 1993
 Sambas de Enredo Grupo Especial, 1994 Carnival, on track Atrás da Verde-e-Rosa só não vai quem já morreu by David Corrêa, Paulinho Carvalho, Carlos Sena and Bira do Ponto, with Caetano Veloso, Gilberto Gil and Gal Costa – RCA, 1993
 Dorival, on track Morena do Mar by Dorival Caymmi – Columbia, vários, 1994
 João Batista do Vale, by João do Vale, on track Estrela Miúda by João do Vale and Luiz Vieira – RCA, 1994
 Gente de Festa, by Margareth Menezes, on track Libertar by Roberto Mendes and J. Velloso – Continental, 1995
 Brasil em Cy, by Quarteto em Cy on track A Noite do Meu Bem by Dolores Duran – CID, 1996
 Belô Velloso, on track Brincando by Mabel Velloso e Alexandre Leão – Velas, 1996
 Recife Frevo é, on track Frevo nº 01 de Recife by Antonio Maria – Virgin, vários, 1996
 Alfagamabetizado, by Carlinhos Brown on track Quixabeira by domínio popular, with Caetano Veloso, Gilberto Gil e Gal Costa – EMI, 1996
 Agora, by Orlando Moraes on track A Montanha e a Chuva by Orlando Moraes – Som Livre, 1997
 Songbook Djavan, on track Morena de Endoidecer by Djavan and Cacaso – Lumiar discos, 1997
 Álbum Musical, by Francis Hime, on track Pássara de Francis Hime and Chico Buarque – WEA, 1997
 Amigos, by Angela Maria, on track Orgulho by Nelson Wederkind and Waldir Rocha – Columbia, 1997
 Livro, by Caetano Veloso, on track Navio Negreiro from a poem by Castro Alves – Polygram, 1997
 Pequeno Oratório do Poeta para o Anjo, poems by Neide Archanjo
 Agô – Pixinguinha 100 anos, on track Fala Baixinho by Pixinguinha and Hermínio Bello de Carvalho – Som Livre, various, 1997
 Diplomacia, by Batatinha on track Bolero by Batatinha and Roque Ferreira – Emi, 1998
 Songbook Marcos Valle, on track Preciso Aprender a Ser Só by Paulo Sérgio Valle and Marcos Valle – Lumiar Discos, 1998
 Brasil são outros 500, on track Tocando em Frente by Almir Sater and Renato Teixeira, new version featuring actress Vera Holtz – Som Livre, 1998
 Alcione Celebração, on track Linda Flor by Luiz Peixoto, Marques Porto, Henrique Vogeler and Cândido Costa – Polygram, 1998
 Songbook Chico Buarque, on tracks Até Pensei by Chico Buarque and Sobre Todas as Coisas by Chico buarque and Edu Lobo – Lumiar Discos, 1999
 Sinfonia de Pardais, in honor to Herivelto Martins, on track Segredo by Herivelto Martins and Marino Pinto – Som Livre, various, 1999
 Doces Bárbaros Bahia, on track 'Hino do Esporte Clube Bahia' (Adroaldo Ribeiro Costa), with Gal Costa, Gilberto Gil and Caetano Veloso – 2000
 Chico Buarque e as cidades, on track Olhos nos Olhos by Chico Buarque – DVD, directed by José Henrique Fonseca – BMG, 2000
 Nelson Gonçalves Movie Soundtrack, on track 'Caminhemos' (Herivelto Martins), with Nelson Gonçalves – 2001
 Ana Carolina, on track Dadivosa by Ana Carolina, Neusa Pinheiro and Adriana Calcanhoto – and on the sample of the text Antônio Bivar Era uma Vez – BMG, 2001
 Eu vim da Bahia, on tracks É um Tempo de Guerra by Augusto Boal, Gianfrancesco Guarnieri and Edu Lobo, Gloria in excelsis (Missa agrária), by Gianfrancesco Guarnieri and Carlos Lyra and on De Manhã by Caetano Veloso – BMG Brasil, 2002
 Doutor do baião (tributo a Humberto Teixeira), on track 'Asa Branca' by (Luiz Gonzaga and Humberto Teixeira) - 2003
 Alcione ao vivo 2, by Alcione, on track 'Ternura Antiga' (Dolores Duran), with Alcione - 2003
 Todo Acústico, by Joanna, on track 'Maninha' (Chico Buarque and Vinícius de Moraes), with Joanna - 2003
 Pequeno oratório do poeta para o anjo, by Neide Arcanjo, narrating all tracks (Introduçtion; era o mar e parecia ser o mar. Era o mar.; Era a quimera e parecia ser o amor. Era a quimera.; Era o caule e parecia ser a flor. Era o caule.; Era a beleza e parecia ser a beleza. Era a beleza.) - 2004
 Namorando a Rosa (tribute to Rosinha de Valença), on track 'Chuá-chuá' (Ary Pavão and Pedro de Sá Pereira), with Joanna - 2005
 2 Filhos de Francisco Movie Soundtrack, on track 'Tristeza do jeca' (Angelino de Oliveira), with Caetano Veloso - 2005
 ODE DESCONTÍNUA E REMOTA PARA FLAUTA E OBOÉ (DE ARIANA PARA DIONÍSIO) - Poems by Hilda Hilst with music by Zeca Baleiro, on track ‘Canção III’ - 2006
 A Hora da Estrela Movie, by Clarice Lispector - Maria Bethânia reads the author's dedication on the narrated version of the book - 2006
 Olivia Byington, homonymous CD by Olivia Byington; Maria Bethânia participates on Mãe Quelé theme - 2006
 Menino do Rio, by Mart'nália, on track 'São Sebastião' (Totonho Villeroy) - 2006
 100 anos de frevo, on track 'Frevo nº 1 do Recife' (Antônio Maria) - 2007
 Senhora raiz, by Roberta Miranda, on track 'Guacira' (Hekel Tavares and Joracy Camargo), with Roberta Miranda - 2008
 Multishow Registro - Pode Entrar, by Ivete Sangalo, on track 'Muito Obrigado, Axé' (Carlinhos Brown), with Ivete Sangalo - 2009
 Tecnomacumba - A tempo e ao vivo, by Rita Ribeiro on track 'Iansã' (Gilberto Gil and Caetano Veloso), with Rita Ribeiro - 2009
 Canta o samba da Bahia ao vivo, by Beth Carvalho, on track 'De manhã' (Caetano veloso), with Beth Carvalho and Caetano Veloso - 2009
 Multishow Registro - N9ve + 1, by Ana Carolina on track 'Eu que não sei quase nada do mar' (Ana Carolina), with Ana Carolina - 2009
 Insensato coração Telenovela Soundtrack), on track 'Trocando em miúdos (Chico Buarque) - 2011
 Salve São Francisco, by Geraldo Azevedo on track 'Carranca que chora' (Geraldo Azevedo and Capinan), with Geraldo Azevedo - 2011
 Duas Faces - Jam Session, by Alcione on track 'Sem mais adeus' (Vinícius de Moraes and Francis Hime), with Alcione - 2011
The Rough Guide To Voodoo, contributed track "Canto De Oxum" - 2013

Music videos

Video albums

Concert tour videos

As featured artist
 Ana Carolina - Estampado
 Concertos MPBR 
 Alcione - Ao vivo 2
 Chico César - Cantos e encontros de uns tempos pra cá
 Beth Carvalho canta o samba da Bahia
 Tecnomacumba

References 

Bethania, Maria
Latin music discographies